Phramongkutklao College of Medicine is the first and only medical cadet school in Thailand. The college is the seventh medical school established in Thailand by a royal command of King Bhumibol Adulyadej. Phramongkutklao College of Medicine is an affiliated college of Mahidol University. This school only accepts students whose parents both are natural-born-citizens.

History 
In 1939 the government of Thailand approved the establishment of the "Army Medic School." The Army Medic School trained doctors serving in the Royal Thai Army until 1947 when the program was halted due to a lack of equipment and educators.

The idea of reopening the school appeared in various times from 1947 to 1973, but was rejected due to a lack of readiness. However, in 1973, in King Bhumibol Adulyadej's speech to medical students at Siriraj Hospital, the idea of reestablishing a medical cadet school was revived. On October 3, 1973, the Royal Thai Army approved the establishment of a "Medical Cadet College," which was renamed "Phramongkutklao College of Medicine" one year later. The name "Phramongkutklao" was granted by King Bhumibol Adulyadej. It was the regal name of King Vajiravudh, King Bhumibol Adulyadej's uncle. The college was officially established on the 16th of June in 1975.

Education
Phramongkutklao College admits around 100 medical military cadets per academic year through the Consortium of Thai Medical Schools Examination (กสพท). The course of study is separated into three parts over six years. In the first (pre-medical) year, cadets study at the Faculty of Science, Kasetsart University. In the second and third (preclinical) years, cadets study at the college, while the clinical years (fourth, fifth and sixth) is taught at Phramongkutklao Hospital. The military training component is provided by the Chulachomklao Royal Military Academy.

Graduates from Phramongkutklao College of Medicine can apply for Royal Thai Army, Royal Thai Navy, Royal Thai Air Force, Royal Thai Armed Forces Headquarters as military doctors or for Ministry of Public Health (Thailand) as civilian doctors.

Departments
Pre-clinical years
Department of Anatomy
Department of Biochemistry
Department of Microbiology
Department of Pathology
Department of Parasitology
Department of Pharmacology
Department of Physiology
Department of Military and Community Medicine

Clinical years
Department of Pediatrics
Department of Ophthalmology
Department of Psychiatry
Department of Obstetrics Gynecology
Department of Anesthesia
Department of Rehabilitation Medicine
Department of Emergency Medicine
Department of Radiology
Department of Surgery
Department of Orthopaedic surgery
Department of Medicine
Department of Family Medicine
Department of Otolaryngology
Department of Forensic Medicine

Main Teaching Hospital
 Phramongkutklao Hospital

Affiliated Teaching Hospitals 

 Military
 Ananda Mahidol Hospital, Royal Thai Army, Lopburi Province
 Fort Suranari Hospital, Royal Thai Army, Nakhon Ratchasima Province
 Bhumibol Adulyadej Hospital, Royal Thai Air Force, Bangkok
 Queen Sirikit Naval Hospital, Royal Thai Navy, Chonburi Province
 Bangkok Metropolitan Administration
 Charoenkrung Pracharak Hospital
 Ministry of Public Health
 Nopparat Rajathanee Hospital, Bangkok
Phra Nakhon Si Ayutthaya Hospital, Phra Nakhon Si Ayutthaya Province
 Chonburi Hospital, Chonburi Province
 Maharat Nakhon Ratchasima Hospital, Nakhon Ratchasima Province

See also
List of medical schools in Thailand

External links
Phramongkutklao College of Medicine Website

References

 Article incorporates material from the corresponding article in the Thai Wikipedia.

Phramongkutklao College of Medicine
Colleges in Thailand
Royal Thai Army
1975 establishments in Thailand